Mount Kelly is a rural locality in the Shire of Burdekin, Queensland, Australia.

History 
The locality was named and bounded on 23 February 2001. It is presumably named after Kelly Mountain (186 metres) at  within the locality.

References 

Shire of Burdekin
Localities in Queensland